Sparks (Կայծեր Kaitser) is an 1884 Armenian language novel by the novelist Raffi. The novel was translated into Russian as «Искры» (1949).

References

External links
Twelve Selections from Sparks

1884 novels
Novels by Raffi
Armenian-language novels